These are the rosters of all participating teams at the women's water polo tournament at the 2012 Summer Olympics in London.

Pool A

The following is the Chinese roster in the women's water polo tournament of the 2012 Summer Olympics.

Head coach: Juan Jané

The following is the Hungarian roster in the women's water polo tournament of the 2012 Summer Olympics.

Head coach: András Merész

The following is the Spanish roster in the women's water polo tournament of the 2012 Summer Olympics.

Head coach: Miki Oca

The following is the American roster in the women's water polo tournament of the 2012 Summer Olympics.

Head coach: Adam Krikorian

Pool B

On 12 June 2012, the Australian roster for the women's water polo tournament was announced.

Head coach: Greg McFadden

The following is the British roster in the women's water polo tournament of the 2012 Summer Olympics..

Head coach: Szilveszter Fekete

The following is the Italian roster in the women's water polo tournament of the 2012 Summer Olympics.

Head coach: Fabio Conti

The following is the Russian roster in the women's water polo tournament of the 2012 Summer Olympics.

Head coach: Aleksandr Kabanov

See also
Water polo at the 2012 Summer Olympics – Men's team rosters

References

External links
Official website

Women's team rosters
2012
2012 in women's water polo
Women's water polo competitions